Safford may refer to :
 Safford, Arizona
 Safford, Alabama, an unincorporated community in Dallas County, Alabama
 Safford House, a historic home in Tarpon Springs, Florida
 Safford Cape (1906–1973), American composer and musicologist
 Andrew Safford House, 1819, designed in the Federal style by an unknown architect
 Anson P.K. Safford (1830–1891), 3rd Governor of Arizona Territory (1869–1877)
 Laurance Safford (1890–1973), a U.S. Navy cryptologist
 Truman Henry Safford (1836–1901), an American calculating prodigy
 William Edwin Safford (1859–1926), an American botanist and ethnologist
 Benton Safford, a fictional character in novels by R. B. Dominic
 James M. Safford (1822–1907), an American geologist

See also
 Katherine Safford Harris, a noted psychologist and speech scientist
 George Safford Parker (1863–1937), an American inventor and industrialist
Safford Unified School District v. Redding, a United States Supreme Court case concerning a strip search conducted by public school officials